The following television stations in the United States brand as channel 5 (though neither using virtual channel 5 nor broadcasting on physical RF channel 5):
 KCWQ-LD in Palm Springs, California
 KECY-DT2 in El Centro, California
 KION-TV in Salinas, California, which brands as 5/46
 KRBK in Springfield, Missouri
 KSBY-DT2 in San Luis Obispo, California
 KSWB-TV in San Diego, California
 KTKA-DT3 in Topeka, Kansas
 KXPI-LD in Pocatello, Idaho
 WBGH-CA in Binghamton, New York
 WIYE-LD2 in Parkersburg, West Virginia
 WLAJ-DT2 in Lansing, Michigan
 WWCW in Lynchburg, Virginia

The following television stations in the United States formerly branded as channel 5:
 KSNB-TV in York, Nebraska
 KWWT in Odessa, Texas

The following television stations in the United States, which are no longer broadcasting, formerly branded as channel 5:
 Toledo 5, a cable-only station in Toledo, Ohio

05 branded